Korte may refer to:

Korte (surname)
Korte, Izola, a village in the Municipality of Izola, southeastern Slovenia (the Littoral region)
The Korte Company, St. Louis, Missouri, USA